The William R. Boyd Unit is a state Prison housing male inmates located approximately 6 miles northeast of Teague, Texas and approximately 5 miles southwest of Fairfield, Texas.

The prison is on approximately 734 acres of land and is operated by the Texas Department of Criminal Justice Correctional Institutions Division employing 292 people as of August 31, 2012.

References

Prisons in Texas
Buildings and structures in Freestone County, Texas
1992 establishments in Texas